Herman Skjerven (27 October 1872 – 14 March 1952) was a Norwegian sport shooter. He was born in Hafslo in the current Luster municipality, and his club was Oslo Østre Skytterlag. He competed in the military rifle at the 1912 Summer Olympics in Stockholm.

References

External links

1872 births
1952 deaths
People from Luster, Norway
Shooters at the 1912 Summer Olympics
Olympic shooters of Norway
Norwegian male sport shooters
Sportspeople from Vestland
20th-century Norwegian people